Unakkaga Naan is a 1976 Indian Tamil-language drama film produced by K. Balaji and directed by C. V. Rajendran. Starring Sivaji Ganesan, Gemini Ganesan, Lakshmi and Vennira Aadai Nirmala, it is a remake of the 1973 Hindi film Namak Haraam. The film was released on 26 January 1976.

Plot 
Raja and Ramu are two good friends who are as close as brothers going on to wear the same clothes with both willing to die or kill for each other. Raja, the rich one of the two faces many challenges after attempting to tackle a union leader at Raja's mill. He is also insulted by the same union leader.   

Ramu swears revenge, changes his name to Shankar, joins Raja's factory, impresses the workers, climbs up the ranks and eventually becomes the union leader only for him to realize that the union leader Dharmalingam was right and the labour was living in abject poverty taking up the fight against his friend. Things get awry when their friendship becomes known to the workers who later understand that he is now on their side. In the end, Ramu dies fighting for the workers due to the nexus between Raja's father and the corrupt manager causing Raja to give up all his properties and take up Ramu's work.

Cast 
Sivaji Ganesan as Raja
Gemini Ganesan as Ramu/Sankar
Lakshmi as Radha
Vennira Aadai Nirmala as Meena
K. Balaji as Raja's home servant
Major Sundarrajan as Chakravarthi
S. V. Subbaiah as Dharmalingam
R. S. Manohar as Arjunan
S. V. Ramadas as Bar fighter
V. K. Ramasamy as Alvar
Nagesh as Gopu
Manorama as Arasangam
Manimala
V. K. Padmini as Parvathi

Soundtrack 
The soundtrack was composed by M. S. Viswanathan, with lyrics by Kannadasan.

Reception
Kanthan of Kalki praised the performances of star cast, cinematography as highlight and Narayanan's dialogues as short and sweet.

References

External links 
 

1970s Tamil-language films
1976 films
Films directed by C. V. Rajendran
Films scored by M. S. Viswanathan
Indian drama films
Tamil remakes of Hindi films